Marius Paul Trésor (born 15 January 1950) is a French former professional footballer who played as a defender. He was named by Pelé as one of the top 125 greatest living footballers. He is considered one of the best central defenders of all time, and he is regarded as one of France's greatest ever players.

Trésor's career began with the French club Ajaccio. He also played for Olympique de Marseille and Girondins de Bordeaux. With Marseille, he won the French Cup in 1976. He also won the Ligue 1 title in 1984 with Girondins de Bordeaux. For the France national team, Trésor played in the World Cup in 1978 and 1982. He obtained 65 international caps, scoring four goals.

Career statistics

Club

International goals
Scores and results list France's goal tally first, score column indicates score after each Trésor goal.

Honours
Marseille
Coupe de France: 1975–76

Bordeaux
Division 1: 1983–84

Individual
French Player of the Year: 1972
6th French Player of the Century
FIFA 100

Orders
Chevalier of the Légion d'honneur: 1984

References

External links
 
 
 
 
 The jewel in Bordeaux’s crown

1950 births
Living people
FIFA 100
French footballers
Association football defenders
France international footballers
AC Ajaccio players
Olympique de Marseille players
FC Girondins de Bordeaux players
Ligue 1 players
1978 FIFA World Cup players
1982 FIFA World Cup players
Guadeloupean footballers
French people of Guadeloupean descent
Black French sportspeople
Chevaliers of the Légion d'honneur
Outfield association footballers who played in goal